Spaunhorst and Mayn Building is a historic mixed-use commercial and residential building located at Washington, Franklin County, Missouri. The original two-story brick section was built about 1870, with a one-story addition built about 1892.  It sits on a limestone foundation.

It was listed on the National Register of Historic Places in 2007.

References

Commercial buildings on the National Register of Historic Places in Missouri
Residential buildings on the National Register of Historic Places in Missouri
Commercial buildings completed in 1870
Residential buildings completed in 1870
Buildings and structures in Franklin County, Missouri
National Register of Historic Places in Franklin County, Missouri